The women's featherweight (52 kg/114.4 lbs) Low-Kick category at the W.A.K.O. World Championships 2007 in Belgrade was the lightest of the female Low-Kick tournaments, involving nine fighters from two continents (Europe and Asia).  Each of the matches was three rounds of two minutes each and were fought under Low-Kick rules.   

Due to the low number of competitors unsuitable for a tournament designed for sixteen, seven women had byes through to the quarter finals.  The tournament was won by Turkey's Seda Duygu Aygün who defeated Ukrainian Nadiya Khayenok in the final by unanimous decision.  Aliya Boranbayeva from Kazakhstan and Maria Krivoshapkina from Russia won bronze medals for their semi final appearances.

Results

Key

See also
List of WAKO Amateur World Championships
List of WAKO Amateur European Championships
List of female kickboxers

References

External links
 WAKO World Association of Kickboxing Organizations Official Site

Kickboxing events at the WAKO World Championships 2007 Belgrade
2007 in kickboxing
Kickboxing in Serbia